Anne Richard (born 10 April 1960) is a Belgian former freestyle swimmer. She competed in four events at the 1976 Summer Olympics.

References

External links
 

1960 births
Living people
Belgian female freestyle swimmers
Olympic swimmers of Belgium
Swimmers at the 1976 Summer Olympics
Sportspeople from Liège